George Millar (born 1947) is a Northern Irish singer-songwriter, guitarist and co-founder and leader of the Irish folk group The Irish Rovers.

Biography
George was born in Ballymena, County Antrim, ca. 1947, the brother of Will Millar and Sandra Beech. As children, Will and Sandra performed as "The Millar Kids" (George sometimes joined them on spoons) in Ireland before the family emigrated to Canada. While in his teens, George met Jimmy Ferguson at an Irish function in Toronto in 1963. They began playing as The Irish Rovers and were soon joined by George's cousin Joe Millar who also emigrated to Canada. After touring around Ontario playing in cafes, clubs and hotels, George, Jim and Joe left Toronto for Calgary where they joined brother Will Millar who was performing on "Just 4 Fun", a children's TV show. With the addition of Will, The Irish Rovers became four and played at The Depression Coffee House in Calgary.  Later headed to California where they made a name for themselves at the Purple Onion in San Francisco. They were later joined by Wilcil McDowell.

George sings lead vocal on most of their recordings, including the original 1967 recording of "The Black Velvet Band". He is also lead on "Lord of the Dance", "No More Bread and Butter", "The Lass With The Bonny Brown Hair", "Home To Bantry Bay", and the ballad which we wrote after the death of his wife Betsy, "And The Sun It Still Rises".

George has performed on television throughout the 1970s and 1980s on three international Irish Rovers television series and more recently on three Irish Rovers television specials in the last few years.

As of 2020, George is still touring with the Irish Rovers.

Compositions
The Irish Rovers concert performances and album releases are full of Millar's compositions. In the early days of the band he wrote many songs with his brother, Will Millar.

George Millar's compositions include "No More Bread and Butter" which appeared in the film, "Dudley Do-Right", the title track from their album/cd, "Gracehill Fair", as well as "Bells Over Belfast", "The Girls of Derry", "The Boys of Belfast", "Rambling Boys of Pleasure", "And The Sun It Still Rises". His more recent songs include "The Titanic", "The Dublin Pub Crawl", and "Whores and Hounds".

He has also written several children's songs for The Irish Rovers album, "Songs for the Wee Folk", and more for The Irish Rovers "The Irish Rovers, 50 Years", including "The Rovers Farewell", and "Her Wonderful Ass".

Music producer
George Millar has produced all of The Irish Rovers albums since 1993 for Rover Records. He has also produced albums for his brother, Will Millar and sister, Sandra Beech.

Awards and recognition

 1982: winner, Producer, Juno Award for Best Children's Album, Inch By Inch
 2011: winner, Producer/Songwriter, Vancouver Island Music Awards, SOCAN - Song of the Year, Gracehill Fair

References 

Nanaimo News Bulletin - Irish Pride By Melissa Fryer

External links 
The Irish Rovers Official Website
George Millar Official Facebook
Irish Rovers Official Facebook
20 Questions with George Millar
The Irish Rovers' discography at the Balladeers
Belfast Telegraph Television - Irish Rovers back home to make new DVD
Canadian Encyclopedia entry

Male singers from Northern Ireland
Guitarists from Northern Ireland
Irish male guitarists
Canadian male singers
Canadian guitarists
People from Ballymena
Living people
1947 births
Musicians from County Antrim
Canadian male guitarists